"Rapture's Delight" is the ninth episode of the sixth season of the American animated television series American Dad!. It originally aired on Fox in the United States on December 13, 2009. This episode centers around Stan and Francine's life after the vast majority of the church, including Hayley and Steve, are raptured. When Stan begins to blame Francine for not getting into heaven, Francine ends their relationship and befriends a man whom she later finds out to be Jesus. Francine becomes his bride, leaving Stan behind to participate in the armageddon.

This episode was written by Chris and Matt McKenna and directed by Joe Daniello. It is the third American Dad! Christmas special, following "The Best Christmas Story Never Told" and "The Most Adequate Christmas Ever". It received acclaim upon its airing from television critics, with many going on to call it one of the best episodes of the series. This episode was watched by 6.2 million homes during its initial airing, and it acquired a 3.1 rating in the 18-49 demographic. Paget Brewster returns to reprise her role of Michelle in the episode. Andy Samberg guest stars as both "Ricky the Raptor" of the "Christian Kids" video, and as the Anti-Christ in the episode. Other guest stars were Mike Barker, Will Forte, Skyler Gisondo, Tom Kenny, Matt McKenna, Murray Miller, Martin Mull, and Don Tai Theerathada.

Plot
Stan is upset when he cannot find his family a good seat for a standing-room only Christmas Day church service. To alleviate this, Francine takes him to have sex with her in the closet. When they come out, everybody in the church has gone, with their clothes left behind.  Upon exiting the church, Stan discovers that he, Roger, and Francine are among those left on Earth during the Rapture (Stan and Francine because they had sex in a holy place, and Roger because he wasn't human to begin with), while Hayley and Steve have ascended. Francine becomes upset when Stan cares more about ascending into Heaven than being with her and leaves him; she soon meets Jesus Christ in his second coming and becomes his girlfriend.

Seven years pass and the war between Jesus and the Anti-Christ reduces the world to a post-apocalyptic wasteland, with the human race on the brink of extinction. The survivors have degenerated into savage bikers, militiamen, and prostitutes. Jesus travels by motorcycle to the war-torn city of Denver, Colorado and meets in a local bar with Stan, who has lost sight in one eye and replaced one hand with a blade. Jesus convinces him to help rescue Francine, who has recently been captured by the Anti-Christ. Stan agrees to do so on the condition that Jesus send him to Heaven afterwards. On their mission, they meet up with Roger, who for the past seven years has been trying to repair his spaceship in order to return to his home planet and escape the war. They get to the United Nations Building, where they find Francine bound in an upside-down manger.

Stan and Jesus meet with the Anti-Christ, depicted as an effeminate supervillain who claims to be the opposite of Jesus. When he tries to trap them, the container breaks apart; being the opposite of Jesus, he is a bad carpenter. After a drawn-out battle, Jesus jumps onto Anti's back and breaks his neck. Anti survives and attempts to shoot Jesus but Stan takes the bullet for him, giving Jesus enough time to throw a cross-shaped shuriken into the Anti-Christ's head, killing him. When Francine tears Stan's shirt away to look at the wound, she sees that he has always kept their wedding rings, and he admits that he had in fact come to save Francine. He activates a bomb to destroy the lair and end the war once and for all. Francine tries to rescue him but Stan asks her to leave lest the explosion kill her too. Stan dies in the blast and is sent to heaven. When Michelle guides him to his own "personalized heaven", Stan enters his home just the way it was at the beginning of the episode, the only difference being Klaus' dead fish body being mounted on a plaque hanging on the wall.

Production

"Rapture's Delight" was directed by series regular Joe Daniello, in his first episode of the season. This would be the first episode that he would direct since the season five episode "Delorean Story-an". It was written by series regulars Chris and Matt McKenna, their first script for the show since the previous season's "Bar Mitzvah Hustle". Seth MacFarlane, the creator and executive producer of American Dad!, as well as its sister shows Family Guy and The Cleveland Show, served as the executive producer for the episode, along with series veterans Mike Barker, Rick Wiener, Matt Weitzman, and Kenny Schwartz. Diana Retchey was the animation producer for the episode, in her ninth episode of the season. Amanda Bell served as the production manager, and this episode would be Bell's seventh episode of the season where she served as the production manager.

Reception
"Rapture's Delight" was broadcast on December 13, 2009 as part of the animated television block on Fox. It was preceded by The Simpsons, and its sister shows The Cleveland Show and Family Guy. It was watched by 6.2 million homes during its initial airing, according to the Nielsen ratings, despite airing simultaneously with Sunday Night Football on NBC, Extreme Makeover: Home Edition on ABC, and Cold Case on CBS. The episode garnered a 3.1 rating in the 18-49 demographic, slightly edging out over The Cleveland Show, but having a slight lower rating that The Simpsons and lower than Family Guy by a considerable margin. The episode's total viewership and ratings decreased slightly from the previous episode, "G-String Circus", which was watched by 6.4 million homes during its original airing and received a 3.3 rating in the 18-49 demographic.

"Rapture's Delight" was met with acclaim from many television critics upon its initial airing. Emily VanDerWerff of The A.V. Club gave it a very positive review. She opined: "And then after I was pretty well convinced that nothing could top The Simpsons, this came along and was one of the best American Dad episodes I've ever seen. It's entirely possible this is just because the show hit my sweet spot [...] but the way the show started out as a fairly standard American Dad episode and then just gradually went more and more batshit insane was definitely worth it." She went on to give the episode an "A" grade, the highest grade of the night, beating out The Simpsons episode "O Brother, Where Bart Thou?", The Cleveland Show episode "A Cleveland Brown Christmas", and Family Guy episode "Business Guy". Jason Hughes of TV Squad gave the episode a very positive review, and went on to write, "American Dad was always the one that stayed with the characters and avoided trips into fantasy. Wacky asides and over-the-top shenanigans are a staple of Family Guy and have proven a smaller, but still important, part of The Cleveland Show. So I was left with my jaw hanging open when the rapture kicked in and people started flying off to heaven. Admittedly, I've not seen every episode of American Dad, so maybe this isn't as surprising an episode as I thought it was. It was, however, a simply fantastic episode." He also went on to comment on the controversy surrounding the episode, saying "I'd imagine this episode will be met with plenty of controversy, for their portrayal of Francine and Jesus having a relationship among many other things, but I still found myself laughing at Roger's hysteria over Christianity. Looking at it from his very outside perspective [...] the whole thing must seem as equally ridiculous as any of our science fiction and fantasy premises."

References

External links

2009 American television episodes
Post-apocalyptic television episodes
Portrayals of Jesus on television
Apocalyptic television episodes
American Dad! (season 6) episodes
American Christmas television episodes